College of Arts and Crafts, established in 1939, is a fine arts college in Patna, Bihar. It  is affiliated to Patna University, and offers undergraduate and postgraduate courses in fine arts.

Accreditation
College of Arts and Crafts was awarded B grade by the National Assessment and Accreditation Council (NAAC).

References

External links
College of Arts and Crafts

Colleges affiliated to Patna University
Art schools in India
Universities and colleges in Patna
1939 establishments in India
Educational institutions established in 1939